Joseph Siravo (March 11, 1955 – April 11, 2021) was an American actor, producer, and educator. He acted on Broadway in the Tony Award-winning productions of Oslo and The Light in the Piazza. His roles in film and television included Johnny Soprano in The Sopranos and Fred Goldman in The People v. O. J. Simpson: American Crime Story.

Early life
Siravo was born on March 11, 1955, in Washington, D.C., where he was also raised. He was a graduate of both Stanford University and the Tisch School of the Arts.

Career
Siravo's screen debut was in the 1993 film Carlito's Way. His character, Vincent "Vinnie" Taglialucci, seeks revenge for the death of his father and brother at the hands of a corrupt lawyer (Sean Penn) while accusing Carlito Brigante (Al Pacino) of assisting in the murder.
Siravo appeared briefly in the Law & Order episode entitled "Burned" (S8; Ep9) in 1997.
Siravo was cast in 1999 to play the role of Johnny Soprano, father of Tony Soprano, on The Sopranos. His character was included in five episodes during the series' run.

In the First National Tour of Jersey Boys, he played more than 2000 performances as Angelo DeCarlo.

He portrayed mobster John Gotti in the 2015 film The Wannabe as well as Gene Gotti in the 1998 made-for-TV film Witness to the Mob. He played the role of Niko in seasons one and two of the NBC show The Blacklist, and in 2015 played the role of Nicholas Bianco, the husband of Anna Bianco (Kathrine Narducci), in "Love Stories", the 13th episode of the fifth season of the CBS police procedural drama Blue Bloods. In the 2016 FX miniseries The People v. O.J. Simpson: American Crime Story, Siravo portrayed Fred Goldman, father of murder victim Ronald Goldman. In 2019 he played the role of Cardinal Mancini, a senior Vatican official in charge of the Pope's security on his visit to New York, in the 15th episode of the first season of the medical drama New Amsterdam.

Siravo appeared as John A. Rizzo, former Acting General Counsel of the CIA in the 2019 film, The Report, executive produced by Steven Soderbergh and directed by Scott Z. Burns.

Death
Siravo died from cancer on April 11, 2021, at the age of 66. He had been diagnosed with stage four prostate cancer in 2017, which subsequently spread to his colon.

Filmography

Film
Carlito's Way (1993) - Vinnie Taglialucci
The Search for One-eye Jimmy (1994) - Father Julio
Animal Room (1995) - Dr. Rankin
Walking and Talking (1996) - Amelia's Therapist
Snow Day (1999) - Fredo Andolini
101 Ways (The Things a Girl Will Do to Keep Her Volvo) (2000) - Valentino
Labor Pains (2000) - Mario
A Day in Black and White (2001)
Thirteen Conversations About One Thing (2001) - Bureau Chief
WiseGirls (2002) - Gio Esposito
Maid in Manhattan (2002) - Delgado
Shark Tale (2004) - Great White #5 (voice)
16 Blocks (2006) - District Attorney Haynes (uncredited)
The Wild (2006) - Carmine (voice)
Rockaway (2007) - Blitzer
Turn the River (2007) - Warren
Enchanted (2007) - Bartender
The Wannabe (2015) - John Gotti
Equity (2016) - Frank
The Report (2019) - John Rizzo
Motherless Brooklyn (2019) - Union Boss Speaker

Broadway
Conversations with My Father
The Boys from Syracuse
The Light in the Piazza
Oslo

Off-Broadway
Oslo *OBIE Award for Best Ensemble, dir. Bartlett Sher
Mad Forest *Drama Desk nomination for Best Ensemble, dir. Mark Wing-Davey
My Night with Reg, dir. Jack Hofsiss
Gemini, dir. Mark Brokaw
Tennessee & Me, dir. Bob Balaban
Dark Rapture, dir. Scott Ellis
Major Crimes, dir. Arthur Penn
New York Actor, dir. Jerry Zaks
The Barber of Seville, dir. John Rando

References

External links

Joseph Siravo
Shakespeare & Beyond

1955 births
2021 deaths
20th-century American male actors
21st-century American male actors
American male film actors
American male stage actors
American male television actors
American male voice actors
Deaths from colorectal cancer
Male actors from Washington, D.C.
Place of death missing
Stanford University alumni
Tisch School of the Arts alumni
American people of Italian descent